Horsforth Golf Club is a golf club in the town of Horsforth in West Yorkshire, England. It is located next to Leeds Bradford Airport. It was established in 1906 and celebrated its centenary in 2006.

History

Horsforth Golf Club was formed by a number of residents called together by Messrs. T. Clough and H. Whitfield at a house owned by Mr W.H. Billington on Outwood Lane in Horsforth on 8 November 1906.

On 8 February 1907 it was agreed to take a lease on a site on the Rawdon estate from Walter Egerton John Green-Emmott, of Emmott Hall, at a rent of £140 per year. The club was formally named Horsforth Golf Club at the first General meeting of the Club on 7 March 1907. Sir William Duncan, Bart, of Horsforth Hall was invited to become first President and Mr H Whitfield was appointed the first Captain. The clubhouse had its opening ceremony on 10 August 1907. 

The course was initially laid out by the Greens Committee and the first Professional and Green-keeper, Mr T Tate. The course designer Alister MacKenzie visited the course in 1913 and made various recommendations for improvements and a scheme for bunkering the course. 

The original clubhouse was destroyed by fire on 26 January 1913  and was rebuilt on its current site, reopening on 6 September 1913 at a cost of £1450. It was reported in the Leeds Mercury that the Suffragette Movement also caused damage to the club on 20 February 1913 affecting the eighteenth green and setting fire to a moveable shed used by the members as temporary accommodation. Vote for Women leaflets were left, leaving no doubt as to who the perpetrators were.

In 1925 James Braid was invited to inspect the course, which he did on 19 March 1925, and provided a report for a fee of £14-5-0d. Many of his suggestions were adopted.  

In 1964 the golf course architect Frank Pennink was asked to appraise the course and help its redevelopment after new land was bought in compensation for loss of land taken over by the adjacent airport. 

On 27 May 1985 a Lockheed Tristar, British Airtours flight 101, registration G-BBAI, from Palma Airport, Mallorca, Spain overran the runway on landing at Leeds Bradford Airport. 12 of the 412 people on board suffered minor injuries when exiting down steep rear ramps. The aircraft was severely damaged. There were many sightseers on the course.

Scorecard
{{Golf18|center=true|title=Horsforth Golf Club <ref name=scorecard>

References

External links
Official site

Golf clubs and courses in Yorkshire
1906 establishments in England
Horsforth
Sport in Leeds